The 1933 Tour de Hongrie was the eighth edition of the Tour de Hongrie cycle race and was held from 28 June to 2 July 1933. The race started and finished in Budapest. The race was won by Kurt Stettler.

Route

General classification

References

1933
Tour de Hongrie
Tour de Hongrie